James Daniel Collins (1917-1985) was an American philosopher. He was a president of the Metaphysical Society of America and a recipient of Aquinas Medal.

References

20th-century American philosophers
Phenomenologists
Continental philosophers
Philosophy academics
1917 births
1985 deaths
Catholic University of America alumni
Presidents of the Metaphysical Society of America